Kiselevo is a rural locality (a village) in Verkhovskoye Rural Settlement, Verkhovazhsky District, Vologda Oblast, Russia. The population was 77 as of 2002.

Geography 
Kiselevo is located 36 km southwest of Verkhovazhye (the district's administrative centre) by road. Smetanino is the nearest rural locality.

References 

Rural localities in Verkhovazhsky District